The 1985 Big Sky Conference men's basketball tournament was held March 7–9 at the BSU Pavilion at Boise State University in Boise, Idaho.

Regular season champion Nevada defeated seventh-seeded  in the championship game  for their second consecutive (and second overall) Big Sky tournament title. Nevada was nearly upset in the first round by last-place Idaho, but held to win by three points and advanced.

Format
For the second year, all eight Big Sky members participated in the conference tournament; this was the first in which all seven games were played at the same venue. Teams were seeded based on regular season conference records, and all were entered into the quarterfinal round. For the first time, the host team was not the top seed, as Boise State finished tied for sixth in the regular season and was seeded seventh.

Two upsets occurred in the first round, as the second and third seeds were eliminated.

Bracket

NCAA tournament
The Wolf Pack received an automatic bid to the 64-team NCAA tournament, where they lost to NC State (also nicknamed the Wolfpack) in the first round  in Albuquerque, New Mexico. Regular season runner-up  played in the 32-team NIT, but lost  at UCLA in the first round; the Bruins went on to win the NIT title.

References

Big Sky Conference men's basketball tournament
Tournament
Big Sky Conference men's basketball tournament
Big Sky Conference men's basketball tournament
Basketball competitions in Boise, Idaho
College sports tournaments in Idaho